The Republic of Korea Air Force (ROKAF), also known as the ROK Air Force or South Korean Air Force, is the aerial warfare service branch of South Korea, operating under the Ministry of National Defense of the Republic of Korea.

History

1940s
Shortly after the end of World War II, the South Korean Air Construction Association was founded on August 10, 1946, to publicize the importance of air power. Despite the then-scanty status of Korean armed forces, the first air unit was formed on May 5, 1948, under the direction of Dong Wi-bu, the forerunner to the modern South Korean Ministry of National Defense. On September 13, 1949, the United States contributed 10 L-4 Grasshopper observation aircraft to the South Korean air unit. An Army Air Academy was founded in January 1949, and the ROKAF was officially founded in October 1949.

1950s
The 1950s were a critical time for the ROKAF as it expanded tremendously during the Korean War. At the outbreak of the war, the ROKAF consisted of 1,800 personnel, but was equipped with only 20 trainers and liaison aircraft, including 10 North American T-6 Texan advanced trainers purchased from Canada. The North Korean air force had acquired a considerable number of Yak-9 and La-7 fighters from the Soviet Union, dwarfing the ROKAF in terms of size and strength. During the course of the war, though, the ROKAF acquired 110 aircraft - 79 fighter-bombers, three fighter squadrons, and one fighter wing. The first combat aircraft received were North American F-51D Mustangs, along with a contingent of US Air Force instructor pilots under the command of Major Dean Hess, as part of Bout One Project. The ROKAF participated in bombing operations and flew independent sorties. After the war, the ROKAF Headquarters were moved to Daebangdong, Seoul. Air Force University was also founded in 1956.

1960s

To counter the threat of possible North Korean aggression, the ROKAF underwent a substantial capability enhancement. The ROKAF acquired North American T-28 Trojan trainers, North American F-86D Sabre night- and all-weather interceptors, Northrop F-5 fighters and McDonnell Douglas F-4D Phantom fighter bombers. Air Force Operations Command was established in 1961 to secure efficient command and control facilities. Air Force Logistics Command was established in 1966, and emergency runways were constructed for emergency use during wartime. The Eunma Unit was founded in 1966 to operate Curtiss C-46 Commando transport aircraft used to support Republic of Korea Army and Republic of Korea Marine Corps units serving in South Vietnam during the Vietnam War.

1970s
The ROKAF was posed with a security risk, with an increasingly belligerent North Korea throughout the 1970s. The South Korean government increased its expenditure on the ROKAF, resulting in the purchase of Northrop F-5E Tiger II fighters in August 1974 and F-4E fighter-bombers. Support aircraft, such as Fairchild C-123 Providers and Grumman S-2 Trackers were also purchased at the time. Great emphasis was placed in the flight training program; new trainer aircraft (Cessna T-41 Mescalero and Cessna T-37) were purchased, and the Air Force Education & Training Command was also founded in 1973 to consolidate and enhance the quality of personnel training.

1980s
The ROKAF concentrated on qualitative expansion of aircraft to catch up to the strength of the North Korean Air Force. In 1982, Korean variants of the F-5E, the Jegong-ho were first produced. The ROKAF gathered a good deal of information on the North Korean Air Force when Captain Lee Woong-pyeong, a North Korean pilot, defected to South Korea. The Korean Combat Operations Information center was soon formed and the Air Defence System was automated to attain air superiority against North Korea. When the 1988 Seoul Olympics was held in South Korea, the ROKAF contributed to the success of this event by helping to oversee the entire security system. The ROKAF also moved its headquarters and the Air Force Education & Training Command to other locations. 40 General Dynamics F-16 Fighting Falcon fighters were also purchased in 1989.

1990s

South Korea committed its support for coalition forces during the Persian Gulf War, forming the "Bima Unit" to fight in the war. The ROKAF also provided airlift support for peacekeeping operations in Somalia in 1993. The increased participation in international operations depicted the ROKAF's elevated international position. Over 180 KF-16 fighters of F-16 Block 52 specifications were introduced as part of the Peace Bridge II & III program from 1994. In 1997, for the first time in Korean aviation history, female cadets were accepted into the Korean Air Force Academy.

2000s

The last of the old South Korean 60 F-5A/B fighters were all retired in August 2007, and they were replaced with the F-15K and F/A-50. On October 20, 2009, Bruce S. Lemkin, deputy undersecretary of the U.S. Air Force, said that the ROKAF's limited intelligence, surveillance and reconnaissance (ISR) capabilities increased the risk of instability on the Korean Peninsula and suggested the purchase of American systems such as the F-35 Lightning II to close this gap.

2010s
The South Korean Air Force also expressed interests in acquiring the RQ-4 Global Hawk remotely piloted vehicle (RPV) and a number of Joint Direct Attack Munition conversion kits to further improve its intelligence and offensive capabilities. In 2014, Northrop Grumman awarded a contract to provide South Korea with four RQ-4 Global. The South Korean Air Force acquired 40 F-35s and +20 additional F-35.

2020s
In 2021, the Space Operations Center was established at the Air Force Headquarters.

Organization

Republic of Korea Air Force Headquarters 
 Republic of Korea Air Force Headquarters
 7th Airforce Communication Service Group
 35th Flight Group, based at Seongnam
 52nd Test & Evaluation Group
 53rd Air Demonstration Group, based at Wonju
 91st Civil Engineer Group
 Air Force Aerospace Medical Center
 Air Force Weather Group
 Air Force Operations Command
 Korean Air And Space Operations Center
Air Combat Command
 1st Fighter Wing, based at Gwangju (T-50)
 8th Fighter Wing, based at Wonju (FA-50, KA-1, HARPY)
 10th Fighter Wing, based at Suwon (KF-5E/F, F-4E)
 11th Fighter Wing, based at Daegu (F-15K)
 16th Fighter Wing, based at Yecheon (TA-50, FA-50)       
 17th Fighter Wing, based at Cheongju (F-35A)
 18th Fighter Wing, based at Gangneung (KF-5E/F)
 19th Fighter Wing, based at Chungju (KF-16, F-16)
 20th Fighter Wing, based at Seosan (KF-16)
 29th Tactical Fighter Weapons Group, base at Cheongju
 38th Fighter Group, based at Gunsan (KF-16)
 Air Mobility & Reconnaissance Command
 3rd Flying Training Wing, based at Sacheon (KT-1)
 5th Air Mobility Wing, based at Gimhae (C-130, CN-235, KC-330)
 15th Special Missions Wing, based at Seongnam (C-130, CN-235)
 39th Reconnaissance Wing, based at Chungju (RF-16, RC-800)
 6th Search & Rescue Air Group, base at Cheongju
 231st Search and Rescue Squadron
 233th Search and Rescue Squadron
 235th Search and Rescue Squadron
 Special search and Rescue squad
 28th Flight Group
 51st Air Control Flight Group, base at Gimhae (E-737)
 Air & Missile Defense Command
 1st Air & Missile Defense Brigade
 2nd Air & Missile Defense Brigade
 3rd Air & Missile Defense Brigade
 Air Defense Control Command
 31st Air Defense Control Group (1MCRC)
 32nd Air Defense Control Group (2MCRC)
 33rd Air Defense Control Group
 34th Air Defense Control Group
 Air Force Logistics Command
 Air Force Education & Training Command
 Basic Military Training Wing
 Air Force Aviation Science High School
 1st Logistics School
 2nd Logistics School
 Information Communication School
 Administrative School
 Air Defence Artillery School
 Boramae Leadership Center
 Air Force Academy

Current Major Projects

KF-X future fighter program 

The Korea Aerospace Industries (KAI) KF-21 Boramae (Northern Goshawk) is a multi-role 4.5 generation fighter. It will have capabilities in between the light FA-50 fighter and the high-grade, long range, heavy payload F-15K and F-35 Lightning II.

Mid-altitude unmanned aerial vehicles (MUAV)

The indigenously developed KUS-FS, nicknamed MUAV or Korean Unmanned System (KUS-FS), is designed for armed land and sea Intelligence, Surveillance and Reconnaissance (ISR) missions with endurance of up to 24 hours. Its maiden flight was in 2012. Korean Air's Aerospace Division (KAL-ASD) unveiled its MALE UAV in 2019 with LIG Nex1 SAR and Hanwha EO/IR sensors, aimed for serial production in 2021. It reportedly has a wider wingspan than the Reaper at 25 m and is powered by a 1200 hp Pratt & Whitney PT6 turboprop engine. South Korea will develop turbofan engines to be installed in high-performance unmanned aerial vehicles by 2025.

M-SAM Block II 
In the spring of 2017 the PIP missile (M-SAM Block II) began its final tests, during which it shot down five of five practice ballistic missile targets. Seven (batteries) are scheduled for deployment throughout South Korea by 2022.

L-SAM 
L-SAM refers to a locally made long-range surface-to-air missile current under development, while the Cheolmae II, also known as KM-SAM, is a domestically manufactured medium-range surface-to-air missile capable of engaging an incoming target at an altitude as high as 20 kilometers. The new project has been nicknamed the K-THAAD due to its planned long range of 25 to 93 miles and ability to hit targets high as 200,000 feet. Nearly $1 billion has been devoted to the L-SAM or Cheolmae-4, which is scheduled for completion in 2022 with deployment of four batteries to follow a year or two afterwards.

Long Range Air Defense Radar 
South Korea's Defense Acquisition Program Administration (DAPA) has launched a project to develop an indigenous long-range air defense radar. Foreign-manufactured radars (Lockheed Martin TPS-77) currently in use to monitor Kadiz will be phased out and replaced with the new domestic equipment starting from 2027, according to the agency.

Inventory

Aircraft

Retired aircraft 

Previous aircraft operated by the Air Force consisted of the P-51 Mustang, North American F-86 Sabre,  F-4 Phantom II, Curtiss C-46, Douglas C-47, Grumman S-2 Tracker, Lockheed T-33, BAe 748, Cessna T-37, Cessna A-37, North American T-28, North American T-6, Sikorsky H-19, and the Bell UH-1 Huey.

Air Defence
The ROKAF Air Defence Artillery Command transferred from the Republic of Korea Army's air defense artillery and was established as a basic branch on 1 July 1991.

Military ranks 
Officer ranks can be learned fairly easily if one sees the pattern. "So" equals small; "Jung" equals medium; "Dae" equals large. "Jun" equals the prefix sub-.. Each of these is coupled with "wi" equals company grade, "ryeong" equals field grade, and "jang" equals general. This system is due to the hanja or Sino-Korean origin of the names.

Warrant officers

Roundels

See also 
 Chief of Staff of the Air Force (South Korea)
 Republic of Korea Armed Forces
 Korean People's Army Air Force

References

External links 
 ROK Air Force official website (Korean / English)

 
Military of South Korea